Lamboya or Laboya is an Austronesian language spoken on Sumba, Indonesia. The population figure may include Gaura, which Ethnologue counts as a dialect of both Lamboya and Kodi.

References

Further reading 

Sumba languages
Languages of Indonesia